Adoration of the Magi is a c.1516-1519 painting by Cesare da Sesto, produced during his stay in Messina. It was commissioned by the Congrega di San Niccolò dei Gentiluomini as the high altarpiece for that church. After the church was suppressed at the end of the 18th century, it joined the Bourbon collections and was taken to Naples, where it was displayed in the Quadreria of the Palazzo di Capodimonte and later the Real Museo in the former Palazzo degli Studi. It is now in the National Museum of Capodimonte in Naples.

Sources
Caio Domenico Gallo, "Annali della citta di Messina ... dal giorno di sua fondazione sino a tempi presenti" [1], Tomo I, Messina, Francesco Gaipa, 1756, p225
Giuseppe Fiumara, "Guida per la città di Messina" [2], Messina, 1841, p23
Pierluigi De Vecchi ed Elda Cerchiari, I tempi dell'arte, volume 2, Bompiani, Milano 1999. 

1519 paintings
Paintings in the collection of the Museo di Capodimonte
Sesto
Italian paintings